İstanbul Güngörenspor (formerly known as Güngören Belediyespor) is a sports club located in Güngören, İstanbul, Turkey. This club was formed as Beyoğlu Kapalıçarşıspor in 1983. They moved to Güngören and changed their name to Güngören Belediyespor in 1994. The club is owned by the municipality of Güngören. This club played in the TFF Second League and promoted to Bank Asya 1. League after extra play-offs in 2007–2008 season and relegated to TFF Second League after 2008–2009 season. They changed their name to İstanbul Güngörenspor before the start of the 2011–12 season.

After many promotions and relegations between third and fourth levels of Turkish Football, Güngören B.S. had a chance to promote TFF First League at the end of the 2007 – 2008 season. Though their opponent Adana Demirspor was favourites before the final match at Konya Atatürk Stadium, Güngören B.S. managed to score at the last minute to win 1 – 0 and get promoted.

Following season was hard as expected, Güngören BS tried to secure their place over the relegation zone. Wins against Kasımpaşa S.K. and other title contenders, kept them in mid-table for most of the season. Despite their tries, they relegated to Second League after losing 3–1 to Boluspor at away match on May 10, 2009 as 17th.

Güngören BS played 1st Group of Second League in 2009–10 season and qualified to Promotion Group after finishing it as 2nd. After finishing 2nd in this group, they returned second level immediately. In 2010–11 season, Güngören BS escaped relegation and finished it as 15th. They renamed their name as İstanbul Güngörenspor before start of next season, but they finished First League as 17th and relegated to Second League.

Güngörenspor finished Red Group of Second League as 14th in 2012–13 season. But, after finishing Red Group as 17th, they relegated to fourth level. Finally Güngörenspor finished 3rd Group of Third League as last (18th) and relegated to Regional Amateur League in 2014–15 season. They finished 12th Group of RAL as 10th and faced with Kartal Bulvarspor at play-outs in 2015-16 season. They lost this math as 2-1 in 8 May 2016 and relegated to Istanbul Super Amateur League after three consecutive relegations.

Current squad
As of 15 October 2011

External links
Official website
Güngörenspor on TFF.org

Güngören Belediyespor
Football clubs in Istanbul
Football clubs in Turkey
Association football clubs established in 1983
1983 establishments in Turkey